is a visual novel adventure video game developed by Arc System Works for the Nintendo 3DS. It was released in Japan on May 11, 2016, and in North America and Europe on October 13, 2016, courtesy of Aksys Games.

Overview
Chase is based on two detectives of the Tokyo Metropolitan Police Department's cold case unit, Shounosuke Nanase and Koto Amekura, that are tipped off by an anonymous caller that an explosion five years prior, previously ruled an accident, was purposely set off to mask a murder, leading to a new investigation of the case.

Development and release
Chase was developed by Arc System Works, by former staff members from the studio Cing, including director Taisuke Kanasaki. It is narratively and thematically similar to Hotel Dusk: Room 215 and Last Window: The Secret of Cape West, detective titles developed by Cing before its closure.

The game was released in Japan as a digital-only title for the Nintendo 3DS eShop on May 11, 2016. Aksys Games handled the localization and published the title for North America and Europe on October 13, 2016.

Reception 

Chase: Cold Case Investigations - Distant Memories received "mixed or average" reviews according to review aggregator Metacritic.

References

External links 
 
 

2016 video games
Adventure games
Arc System Works games
Detective video games
Nintendo 3DS eShop games
Nintendo 3DS games
Nintendo 3DS-only games
Single-player video games
Video games about police officers
Visual novels